Ribosome-binding protein 1, also referred to as p180, is a protein that in humans is encoded by the RRBP1 gene.

RRBP1 is a membrane-bound protein found in the endoplasmic reticulum (ER). It was originally identified as the ribosome receptor for the ER, however several groups later demonstrated that this activity did not co-fractionate with RRBP1  
 but rather with Sec61 (i.e. the translocon). RRBP1 can enhance the association of certain mRNAs to the endoplasmic reticulum in a manner that does not require ribosome activity, likely by directly associating the mRNA's phosphate backbone. In addition, RRBP1 may promote the association of polysomes with the translocon  and play a role in ER morphology. RRBP1 may also bind to microtubules. Although the p180 isoform is the most abundant, it may exist in different forms due to removal of tandem repeats by partial intraexonic splicing. RRBP1 has been excluded as a candidate gene in the cause of Alagille syndrome.

References

Further reading